Viminatium was the name of two Roman settlements:

Viminacium in Serbia
Terradillos in Spain